Ikatan Pandu Indonesia (Ipindo) was the World Organization of the Scout Movement-recognized Indonesian national Scouting federation from 1953 to 1961.

When Indonesia became an independent country, there were more than 60 separate Boy Scout and Girl Guide organizations. Most were directly affiliated with some certain political parties or social groups. Attempts were made to unify all Scout organizations into one. The fact that Indonesia is made up of many islands made administration and supervision difficult, and the Japanese occupation caused some twenty separate Scout organizations to spring up, so it took time for them to coalesce.  In September 1951 thirteen of the stronger Scout and Guide organizations nationwide met and decided to found a federating body to satisfy national and international needs.

Ipindo's motto was "Sedia", meaning "Be Prepared" in English. Tuan Soemardjo was elected chief commissioner, and Dr. Bahder Djohan, an old Scout and Minister of Education, became honorary President.  Government approval of Ipindo was granted on February 22, 1952, and President Sukarno consented to become patron of the unifying and correlating National Scout Council. Soon, other Scout and Guide organizations began to merge into Ipindo.

With the 1961 decision to absorb the Fadjar Harapan Pioneer movement organization (founded in 1959), the establishment of a single Scout Movement organization in Indonesia called Gerakan Pramuka Indonesia was officially complete. In May 1961, the then President of Indonesia, Sukarno, signed a presidential regulation making Gerakan Pramuka the official Scout and Guide organization in Indonesia.

References

External links

Scouting in Indonesia
World Organization of the Scout Movement member organizations
Youth organizations established in 1953
Organizations disestablished in 1961